Institute of Archaeologists of Ireland is an Irish archaeology organisation based in Dublin, Ireland. Founded in Merrion Square, Dublin in August 2001, the organisation represents archaeologists who are working throughout Ireland.

References

Archaeological organizations